Oliver Wood (21 February 1942 – 13 February 2023) was a British cinematographer, known for his work on blockbuster action and comedy films such as Die Hard 2, Face/Off, Freaky Friday, Talladega Nights: The Ballad of Ricky Bobby, and the Bourne franchise. He collaborated with directors like Paul Greengrass, John Woo, Renny Harlin, Ron Underwood, and Adam McKay, and was nominated for a BAFTA Award for Best Cinematography for The Bourne Ultimatum.

Biography 
Wood was born in London on 21 February 1942. At the age of 19, he moved to New York City. His first break came for director Leonard Kastle on cult crime film The Honeymoon Killers (1969) where he used available light to give the dark comedy a newsreel look. He shot numerous B-movies and independent films throughout the late 1970s and 1980s,  frequently collaborating with cinematographers Joseph Mangine and Fred Murphy. He also worked as a camera operator on higher-profile projects including Body Rock (1984) and To Live and Die in L.A. (1985), both of which were shot by Robby Müller. He also became a music video and commercial cinematographer, working for directors like Bob Giraldi and Rupert Wainwright.

His big break came when he was director of photography for 53 episodes of stylish crime drama Miami Vice, serving as the series primary DP between 1987 and 1989. His work on the series caught the attention of producers, enabling him to work on big-budget Hollywood films including Die Hard 2 (1990), Face/Off (1997), U-571 (2000) Fantastic Four (2005), and Anchorman 2: The Legend Continues (2013). He was the original director of photography on the swashbuckling action film Cutthroat Island, but suffered an on-set injury and was replaced by Peter Levy. He also shot the Bourne Trilogy, where he worked with director Paul Greengrass to produce a spontaneous, naturalistic effect, often using multiple cameras, frequently handheld, citing films such as The Battle of Algiers as an influence. He was nominated for a BAFTA for The Bourne Ultimatum (2007).

In 2016, Wood shot the remake of Ben-Hur, directed by Timur Bekmambetov, utilizing GoPro cameras to film the movie's action sequences. His last credit was for Morbius (2022).

Death
Wood died from cancer at his home in Los Angeles, California on 13 February 2023 at the age of 80, eight days before his 81st birthday.

Filmography

Additional photography credits

References

External links
 
 Profile
 Selected Resume

1942 births
2023 deaths
Deaths from cancer in California
English cinematographers
English emigrants to the United States
Film people from London